Coolavin (Irish Cúl ó bhFionn) is a barony in south County Sligo, Ireland. It was created from the ancient túath of An Corann.

The O'Garas were originally Lords of Coolavin.  They were succeeded by the MacDermotts, a family of the Milesian clans, who still claim their head to be the Prince of Coolavin to this day.

References

Baronies of County Sligo